Saint-Offenge-Dessous is a former commune in the Savoie department in the Rhône-Alpes region in south-eastern France. On 1 January 2015, Saint-Offenge-Dessous and Saint-Offenge-Dessus merged becoming one commune called Saint-Offenge.

See also
Communes of the Savoie department

References

External links

2015 disestablishments in France
Former communes of Savoie